The following lists events that have happened in 1853 in the Qajar dynasty.

Incumbents
 Monarch: Naser al-Din Shah Qajar

Births
 March 23 – Mozaffar ad-Din Shah Qajar was born in Tehran

Events
 May 5 – The Shiraz earthquake shook the region with a maximum Mercalli intensity of IX (Violent), leaving 13,000 dead.

References

 
Iran
Years of the 19th century in Iran
1850s in Iran
Iran